Björn Graf Finck von Finckenstein (23 July 1958 – 17 December 2021) was a Namibian politician.

Family
Only child and son of Günther Georg Wilhelm Graf Finck von Finckenstein (Farm Tjirundu-South, 17 June 1934 - Windhoek, 15 September 1990) and wife (Otjiwarongo, 8 March 1958) Anka-Margit von Goldammer (Karibib, 26 August 1936 - Usakos, 22 May 1983).

His paternal grandfather Friedrich Georg Bechthold Graf Finck von Finckenstein (Weimar, Saxe-Weimar-Eisenach, Germany, 2 September 1901 - Otjiwarongo, 23 December 1965) went to German South West Africa, where he married (Omaruru, 2 July 1932) his paternal grandmother Dorothea Freiin von Puttkamer (Ornassau, West Prussia, Prussia, Germany, 13 February 1907 - Omaruru, 6 November 1977), who also went to live in the German South West Africa. They also had four daughters there: 
 Hertha Luise Hedwig Gräfin Finck von Finckenstein (Omaruru, 27 April 1933), married (Omaruru, 1 May 1954) to Wilhelm Karl Dörgeloh (Swakopmund, 24 January 1927)
 Freda-Marie Ruth Gräfin Finck von Finckenstein (Swakopmund, 21 April 1936), married (Omaruru, 14 February 1959) to Egon Alfeld (Gobabis, 18 January 1934)
 Barbara Roswitha Gräfin Finck von Finckenstein (Omaruru, 8 November 1939), married (Otjiwarongo, 20 May 1961) to Lutz Hecht (Swakopmund, 23 October 1933)
 Anna-Monika Dorothea Gräfin Finck von Finckenstein (Omaruru, 9 January 1948), married (Otjiwarongo, civ. 1, rel. 2 March 1968) to Johan Janse van Rensburg (De Aaar, 1 April 1941)

Career
He served as Mayor of Windhoek from 1995 to 1998.

Marriage and issue
He married in Windhoek, Namibia, on 6 November 1992 Christine Kendzia, born in Windhoek, South West Africa, South Africa, on 29 September 1971, and had one daughter and one son: 
 Anièlle Gräfin Finck von Finckenstein (Windhoek, 6 March 1993)
 Dominic Günther Graf Finck von Finckenstein (Windhoek, 1 October 1996)

References

1958 births
2021 deaths
Members of SWAPO
Mayors of Windhoek
People from Usakos
White Namibian people
Namibian people of German descent